St. Martin's Episcopal School is a diocesan private college preparatory school in Metairie, Louisiana, a suburb in Greater New Orleans. It is affiliated with St. Martin's Episcopal Church and the Episcopal Diocese of Louisiana. The school also operates George Cottage, an early childhood program for infants and children up to age 3, after which they may opt to join the main school.

History
St. Martin's Episcopal School was founded in 1947 as a co-educational, independent school.  It was the first Episcopal school in the region and operated originally as a parish elementary school on the grounds of its namesake church.  It moved to the current campus on Green Acres Road in 1950 to accommodate the growing number of students.   A high school was added to meet the demand, and it remains the only Episcopal High School in the region. The early childhood learning program, George Cottage, was opened in 2004.  Nearly four thousand students have graduated from St. Martin's since 1951.  Ownership of the school was transferred to the Episcopal Diocese of Louisiana during the 1960s.

The school's eighteen-acre campus has 178,700 square feet of space under roof.  St. Martin's is accredited by the Independent Schools Association of the Southwest, approved by the Louisiana State Department of Education, and holds membership in the Cum Laude Society, the National Association of Independent Schools, the Southwestern Association of Episcopal Schools and the National Association of College Admission Counseling.

Highlights of Recent Accomplishments:
 Every member of the class of 2016 was accepted into a college or university.  Graduates scored 29% higher than the national average on the ACT; they scored an average of 16% higher on the SAT.
 Diversity initiatives include the projected enrollment in school year 2016–2017 of twelve international students, ten from China and two from Honduras.
 St. Martin's team was one of thirty-five named nationally as Lemelson-MIT InvenTeam finalists.
 The school opened its Gibbs Family Center for Innovation + Design in early 2017.

Organization
St. Martin's comprises four divisions:
George Cottage (Early Childhood: 8 weeks - 3 years)
Lower School (PK–4)
Middle School (5–8)
Upper School (9–12)

Athletics
St. Martin's Episcopal School athletics competes in the LHSAA.

Notable alumni
The school's alumni include:
Barbara Farris, WNBA player
Leigh "Little Queenie" Harris
Chris Leopold, former District 105 member of the Louisiana House of Representatives
Gerald Lewis 
Rhett Lewis 
Bob Livingston, former U.S. Congressman
Eugénie Ricau Rocherolle 
Kirk Talbot, member of the Louisiana House of Representatives  
Ashley Tappin, Olympic gold medalist swimmer
Linda Tuero
Edward Ball

References

External links
Official website
StM Saints NOLA.com Page

Schools in Jefferson Parish, Louisiana
Episcopal Church in Louisiana
Episcopal schools in the United States
Private K-12 schools in Louisiana
Independent Schools Association of the Southwest
Educational institutions established in 1947
1947 establishments in Louisiana